Centaurus Secondary School is a high school in Windhoek, the capital of Namibia. It was founded on 23 January 1962 and started with 175 learners transferred from Windhoek High School.

See also
 List of schools in Namibia
 Education in Namibia

References

Schools in Windhoek
1962 establishments in South West Africa
Educational institutions established in 1962